Nizami Ganjavi (c. 1141–1209), Nizami Ganje'i, Nizami, or Nezāmi, whose formal name was Jamal ad-Dīn Abū Muḥammad Ilyās ibn-Yūsuf ibn-Zakkī, was a 12th-century Persian Sunni Muslim poet. Nezāmi is considered the greatest romantic epic poet in Persian literature, who brought a colloquial and realistic style to the Persian epic.  His heritage is widely appreciated and shared by Afghanistan, Republic of Azerbaijan, Iran, the Kurdistan region and Tajikistan.

Life

His personal name was Ilyas and his chosen pen-name was Nezami (also spelled as Nizami and Neẓāmi).  He was born of an urban background in Ganja (Seljuq empire, now Republic of Azerbaijan) and is believed to have spent his whole life in South Caucasus. According to De Blois, Ganja was a city which at that time had predominantly an Iranian population. The Armenian historian Kirakos Gandzaketsi (c. 1200 – 1271) mentions that: "This city was densely populated with Iranians and a small number of Christians".
Because Nezami was not a court poet, he does not appear in the annals of the dynasties.  Tazkerehs, which are the compilations of literary memoirs that include maxims of the great poets along with biographical information and commentary of styles refer to him briefly.  Much of this material in these Tazkerehs are based on legends, anecdotes, and hearsays.  Consequently, few facts are known about Nezami's life, the only source being his own work, which does not provide much information on his personal life.

Parents
Nezami was orphaned early and was raised by his maternal uncle Khwaja Umar who took responsibility for him and afforded him an excellent education. His mother, named Ra'isa, was of Kurdish origin. His father, whose name was Yusuf is mentioned once by Nezami in his poetry.  In the same verse, Nezami mentions his grandfather's name as Zakki.  In part of the same verse, some have taken the word Mu'ayyad as a title for Zakki while others have interpreted it as the name of his great-grandfather.  Some sources have stated that his father might be possibly from Qom. Nezami is variously mentioned as a Persian and/or Iranian.

Family
Nezami was married three times.  His first wife was an enslaved Kipchak who was sent to him by Fakhr al-Din Bahramshah, the ruler of Darband, as part of a larger gift. According to Iraj Bashiri she became Nezami's "most beloved" wife. His only son Mohammad was from this wife. She died after "Khosrow and Shirin" was completed. Mohammad was seven at the time. Nezami mentions his son again in Layli and Majnun adding that now this son is 14 years old and "apple of my eyes". In "Haft Peykar" (Seven Beauties), he also mentions and advises his son about taking more responsibility as the father was growing more frail.

Some modern writers in the late 20th century have claimed that this wife was called Afaq. Vahid Dastgerdi seems to be the first writer to propose this name for Nezami's first wife, but Said Nafisi (at the same time) and a recent source have challenged this interpretation of the corresponding verse in Nezami's work and the assumption that Afaq was the real name of his wife  and have taken the Afaq in that verse to simply mean "horizon" rather than a proper name. Strangely enough, Nezami's two other wives, too, died prematurely – the death of each coinciding with the completion of an epic, prompting the poet to say, "God, why is it that for every mathnavi I must sacrifice a wife!".

Education
Nezami was not a philosopher in the sense of Avicenna or an expositor of theoretical Sufism in the sense of Ibn 'Arabi.  However, he is regarded as a philosopher and gnostic who mastered various fields of Islamic thoughts which he synthesized in a way that brings to mind the traditions of later Hakims such as Qutb al-Din Shirazi.

Often referred to by the honorific Hakim ("the Sage"), Nezami is both a learned poet and master of a lyrical and sensuous style.  About Nezami's prodigious learning there is no doubt. Poets were expected to be well versed in many subjects; but Nezami seems to have been exceptionally so.  His poems show that not only he was fully acquainted with Arabic and Persian literatures and with oral and written popular and local traditions, but was also familiar with such diverse fields as mathematics, astronomy, astrology, alchemy, medicine, botany, Koranic exegesis, Islamic theory and law, Iranian myths and legends, history, ethics, philosophy and esoteric thought, music, and the visual arts.  His strong character, social sensibility, and knowledge of oral and written historical records, as well as his rich Persian cultural heritage unite pre-Islamic and Islamic Iran into the creation of a new standard of literary achievement.  Being a product of the Iranian culture of the time, he not only created a bridge between pre-Islamic and Islamic Iran, but also between Iran and the whole ancient world.

Influences and literary scene

The recent discovery and publication of the anthology titled Nozhat al-Majales contains Persian language quatrains from Nizami and 115 other poets from the northwestern Iran (Arrān, Šarvān, Azerbaijan; including 24 poets from Ganja alone) during the same era.  Unlike other parts of Persia,  where the poets mostly belonged to higher echelons of society such as scholars, bureaucrats, and secretaries, a good number of poets in the northwestern areas rose from among the common people with working-class backgrounds, and they frequently used colloquial expressions in their poetry.  Accordingly, the book demonstrates the social conditions at the time, reflecting the full spread of Persian language and the culture in the region, which is evidenced by the common use of spoken idioms in poems and the professions of many of the poets.  The influence of the northwestern Pahlavi language, for example, which had been the spoken dialect of the region, is clearly observed in the poems contained in this anthology.  However, at the same time, the Caucasus region was entertaining a unique mixture of ethnic cultures. Khaqani's mother was a Nestorian Christian, Mojir Baylqani's mother was an Armenian, and Nezami's mother was a Kurd. Their works reflect the cultural and linguistic diversity of the region.

By the end of the 10th century, Persian literature became widespread from the eastern Mediterranean to the banks of the Indus.  The earliest extant example of Persian poetry from the area is that of Qatran Tabrizi (1009–1072) who served in the courts of the Shaddadid and Rawadid dynasties.  Qatran Tabrizi, is credited with what some scholars in the last century have termed as the founder of the "Azerbaijan" or "Trans-Cacausian" school or "Tabriz School" or "Shirvan School" or "Arranian Style" of Persian poetry.  This school produced a distinctive style of poetry in Persian, which contrasted with "Khurasani" ("Eastern") style in its rhetorical sophistication, its innovative use of metaphor, its use of technical terminology and Christian imagery, the presence of Persian archaism while borrowing from Arabic vocabulary, as well as new concepts.  Other sources including the Encyclopaedia of Islam and traditional Iranian literary sources have used the term "'Iraqi" style for the Persian poetry of Nezami.

The Seljuqs took control of Ganja from the Shaddadids in 1075 and spread Persian literary westwards to their courts.  In the middle of the 12th century, the Seljuk Empire's control of the region weakened and their provincial governors, virtually autonomous local princes, further encouraged Persian culture, art and poetry in their courts. Persian culture characteristically flourished in this era, when political power was diffused and Persian remained the primary language, Persian civil servants and merchants were in great demand and rival dynasties continued to vie for the service of Persian poets.  This was especially true in Ganjeh, the Caucasian outpost town where Nizami lived.  Nezami was patronized by different rulers and dedicated his epics to various rival dynasties, including the Seljuqs, Eldiguzids (who maintained control of Ganja during most of the later 12th century), Shirvanshahs, the ruler of Ahar and Ahmadilis.  Although he enjoyed the patronage of various rulers and princes, he avoided the courts and is generally believed to have lived a secluded life. Since he was not a court poet, he does not appear in the annals of the dynasties, which list the names of events of the ruling families.

According to literary scholar Chelkowski, "it seems that Nezami's favorite pastime was reading Firdawsi's monumental epic Shahnameh (The book of Kings).  Nezami mentioned Ferdowsi as the Sage (Hakim) and Knower/Wise (daanaa) and the great master of discourse, "who has decorated words like new bride." Nezami advises the son of the Shirvanshah to read the Shah-nama and to remember the meaningful sayings of the wise.  Nezami used the Shahnameh as a source in his three epics of Haft Peykar, Khosrow and Shirin and Eskandar-Nameh.

The story of Vis and Ramin also had an immense influence on Nezami. Although Nezami takes the bases for most of his plots from Ferdowsi, but the basis for his rhetoric comes from Gorgani. This is especially noticeable in Khosrow and Shirin, which is of the same meter and imitates some scenes from Vis and Ramin. Nezami's concern with astrology also has a precedent in an elaborate astrological description of the night sky in Vis and Ramin. Nezami had a paramount influence on the romantic tradition, and Gorgani can be said to have initiated much of the distinctive rhetoric and poetic atmosphere of this tradition, with the absence of the Sufi influences, which are seen in Nezami's epic poetry.

The first monumental work of Nezami, the Makhzan al-Asrar is influenced by Sanai's Hadikat al-Hakika. Nezami acknowledges this, but considers his work to be superior. The main similarities between Sanai's poem and Nezami's are in its ethico-philosophical genre, although Nezami uses a different metre and organized the whole work in a different fashion. Khaqani Sherwani daring imagery, was to have a momentous influence on Nezami Ganjavi and through the latter on Persian poetry in general.

Works

Nezami lived in an age of both political instability and intense intellectual activity, which his poems reflect; but little is known about his life, his relations with his patrons, or the precise dates of his works, as the many legends built up around the poet color the accounts of his later biographers. He dedicated his poems to various rulers of the region as was custom of that time for great poets, but avoided court life. Nezami was a master of the Masnavi style (double-rhymed verses).

The Khamsa or Panj Ganj
Nizami's main poetical work, for which he is best known, is a set of five long narrative poems known as the Khamsa ('Quintet or Quinary') or Panj Ganj ('Five Treasures'):
 Makhzan-ol-Asrâr ('The Treasury or Storehouse of Mysteries'), 1163 (some date it 1176)
 Khosrow o Shirin ('Khosrow and Shirin'), 1177–1180
 Leyli o Majnun ('Layla and Majnun'), 1192
 Eskandar-Nâmeh ('The Book of Alexander'), 1194 or 1196–1202
 Haft Peykar ('The Seven Beauties'), 1197

The first of these poems, Makhzan-ol-Asrâr, was influenced by Sanai's (d. 1131) monumental Garden of Truth. The four other poems are medieval romances. Khosrow and Shirin, Bahram-e Gur, and Alexander the Great, who all have episodes devoted to them in Ferdowsi's Shahnameh, appear again here at the center of three of four of Nezami's narrative poems. The adventure of the paired lovers, Layla and Majnun, is the subject of the second of his four romances, and derived from Arabic sources. In all these cases, Nezami reworked the material from his sources in a substantial way.

The Khamsa was a popular subject for lavish manuscripts illustrated with painted miniatures at the Persian and Mughal courts in later centuries. Examples include the Khamsa of Nizami (British Library, Or. 12208), created for the Mughal Emperor Akbar in the 1590s.

Makhzan-ol-Asrâr

The ethico-philosophical poems of about 2,250 Persian distichs was dedicated to Fakhr al-Din Bahramshah, the ruler of Erzinjan.  The story deals with such esoteric subjects as philosophy and theology. The story contains twenty discourses, each of them portraying an exemplary story on religious and ethical topics.  Each chapter concludes with apostrophe to the poet himself containing his pen name.  The content of the poems are indicated in the heading to each chapter and are written in a typical Homiletics style. The stories which discuss spiritual and practical concerns enjoin kingly justice, riddance of hypocrisy, warning of vanity of this world and the need to prepare for the after-life.  The general message of the discourse is that Nezami preaches the ideal way of life drawing attention to his reader of the supreme rank man among God's creatures and approaching of the end life and the necessity of man becoming aware of his spiritual destination.  In a few chapters he address the duties of a king, but as a whole he addresses himself to mankind in general rather than to his royal patrons. In the introduction, the poet provides an account of his solitary vigils, called Khalwat.  There is no indication that these were Sufi vigils, but they are used as a literary fantasy on the spiritually-inclined poet he wanted to be.  In highly rhetorical style, the aim he pursues is to transcend the limitation of secular literature of the courts.  With this work, Nezami joins the destination of Persian poetry, which had started with Sanai and was continued by others, in the first place by Attar.

Not a romantic epic, "The Treasury of Mysteries" was translated into English by Gholam H. Darab in 1945.  After this early work, Nezami turned towards narrative poetry.

Khosrow o Shirin

A story of pre-Islamic Persian origin which is found in the great epico-historical poems of Shahnameh and is based on a true story that was further romanticized by Persian poets. The story  chosen by Nezami, was commissioned and dedicated to the Seljuk Sultan Toghril II, the Atabek Muhammad ibn Eldiguz Jahan Pahlavan and his brother Qizil Arslan.  It contains about 6,500 distichs in length, the story depicts the love of Sassanian Khosrow II Parviz towards his Armenian princess Shirin. Khusrow and Shirin recounts the story of King Khosrow's courtship of Princess Shirin, and the vanquishing of his love-rival, Farhad.  The story has a complex structure with several genres exploited simultaneously; and contains many verbal exchanges and letters, all imbued with lyrical intensity.  Khosrow endures long journeys, physical and spiritual, before returning to Shirin, his true love. They are eventually married, but finally Khosrow is killed by his son and Shirin commits suicide over the body of her murdered husband. Pure and selfless love is represented here embodied in the figure of Farhad, secretly in love with Shirin, who falls victim to the king's ire and jealousy.

The influence of Vis o Ramin is visible as the poem imitates a major scene (that of the lovers arguing in the snow) from Vis o Rāmin, as well as being in the same meter (hazaj) as Gorgāni's poem.  Nezami's concern with astrology also has a precedent in an elaborate astrological description of the night sky in Vis o Rāmin.  In turn, Nezami's great work had a tremendous influence on later authors and many imitations of this work were made.  With complete artistic and structural unity, the epic of Khosrow o Shirin turned to be a turning point not only for Nizami but for all of Persian literature.

Leyli o Majnun
A story of Arabic origin which was later adapted and embellished by the Persians.  The poem of 4,600 distichs was dedicated, in 1192, to Abu al-Muzaffar Shirvanshah, who claimed descent from the Sassanid King, whose exploits are reflected in Nezami's "Seven Beauties" (Haft Paykar).  The poem is based on the popular Arab legend of ill-starred lovers: the poet Qays falls in love with his cousin Layla, but is prevented from marrying her by Layla's father.  Layla's father forbids contact with Qays, so that Qays becomes obsessed and starts singing of his love for Layla in public. The obsession becomes so severe that he sees and evaluates everything in terms of Layla; hence his sobriquet "the possessed" (Majnun).  Realizing that he cannot obtain union, even when other people intercede for him, he leaves society and roams naked in the desert among the beasts. However the image of Layla was so ingrained in him that he cannot eat or sleep. His only activity becomes composing poetry of longing for Layla.  Meanwhile, Layla is married against her will, but she guards her virginity by resisting the advances of her husband. In a secret meeting with Majnun, they meet, but have no physical contact. Rather, they recite poetry to each other from a distance. Layla's husband dies eventually, which removes the legal obstacles to a licit union. However Majnun is so focused on the ideal picture of Layla in his mind, that he fled into the desert again. Layla dies out of grief and is buried in her bridal dress. Hearing this news, Majun rushes to her grave, where he instantly dies. They are buried side by side and their grave becomes a site of pilgrimage. Someone dreams that in Paradise they are united and live as a king and queen.

Nezami composed his romance at the request of the Shirvanshah Akhsatan. Initially, he doubted that this simple story about the agony and pain of an Arab boy wandering in rough mountains and burning deserts would be a suitable subject for royal court poetry and his cultured audience.  It was his son who persuaded him to undertake the project, saying: "wherever tales of love are read, this will add spice to them". Nezami used many Arabic anecdotes in the story, but also adds a strong Persian flavor to the legend.

An important aspect of Layla and Majun is the poet's highly humanitarian approach. During the war by Nawfal in favor of Majnun, the latter is unhappy wishing the termination of the war. Majun gives away his horse and amours to save a gazelle and a stag.

Nezami gave a Persian character to the poem by adding several techniques borrowed from the Persian epic tradition, such as the portrayal of characters, the relationship between characters, description of time and setting, etc. Further, he adapted the different stories about Majnun to fit a well-crafted Persian romantic epic.

The Story of Layla and Majnun by Nizami, was edited and translated into English by Swiss scholar of Islamic culture Rudolf Gelpke and published in 1966. A comprehensive analysis in English containing partial translations of Nezami's romance Layla and Majnun examining key themes such as chastity, constancy and suffering through an analysis of the main characters was published by Ali Asghar Seyed-Gohrab.

Eskandar-Nâmeh

The Romance of Alexander the Great contains 10,500 distichs. There are differences of opinion on whether this or the Haft Paykar was Nezami's last epic.  The names of its dedicatees are uncertain, but the ruler of Ahar, Nosart al-Din Bishkin b. Mohammad has been mentioned. The story is based on Islamic myths developed about Alexander the Great, which derive from Qur'anic references to the Dhu'l-Qarnayn as well as from the Greek Alexander romance of Pseudo-Callisthenes. It consists of two books, Sharaf-Nama and Iqbal-nameh. The poem narrates the three stages in Alexander's life: first as the conqueror of the world; then as a seeker after knowledge, gaining enough wisdom to acknowledge his own ignorance; and finally as a prophet, traveling once again across the world, from west to east, and south to north to proclaim his monotheistic creed to the world at large.  The Sharaf-nama discusses the birth of Alexander, his succession to the throne of Rum (Greece), his wars against Africans who invaded Egypt, his conquest of Persia and his marriage to the daughter of Darius.  The episode also discusses Alexander's pilgrimage to Mecca, his stay in the Caucasus and his visit to Queen Nushaba of Barda' and her court of Amazons.  Alexander conquers India, China and the land of the Rus.  The Sharafnama concludes with Alexander's unsuccessful search for the water of immortal life.

The Iqbal-nameh is a description of Alexander's personal growth into the ideal ruler on a model ultimately derived, through Islamic intermediaries, from Plato's Republic.  He has debates with Greek and Indian philosophers (c.f. with Garshaspnama) and a major portion of the text is devoted to the discourses he has with seven Greek sages. The poet then tells of Alexander's end and adds an account of the circumstances of the death of each of the seven sages. Nezami's image of Alexander is that of an Iranian knight.

An English translation of the Sharaf-Nama by Henry Wilberforce-Clarke was published in 1881 under the title Sikandar Nama e Bara and is available online.

Haft Peykar

A pre-Islamic story of Persian origin, it was dedicated to the ruler of Maragha, 'Ala' Al-Din korp Arslan. It is the story of Bahram V, the Sassanid king, who is born to Yazdegerd after twenty years of childlessness and supplication to Ahura Mazda for a child.  The Haft Peykar is a romanticized biography of the Sasanian Persian empire ruler Bahram Gur.  His adventurous life had already been treated by Ferdowsi in the Shahnama, to which fact Nezami alludes a number of times. In general, his method is to omit those episodes that the earlier poet had treated, or to touch on them only very briefly, and to concentrate on new material.  The poet starts by giving an account of the birth of Bahram Gur and his upbringing in the court of the Arab King No'man and his fabled palace Khwarnaq.  Bahram whose upbringing is entrusted to No'man becomes a formidable huntsman.  While wandering through the fabled palace, he discovers a locked room which contains a depiction of seven princesses; hence the name Haft Peykar (seven beauties).  Each of these princesses is from the seven different climes (traditional Zoroastrian-Islamic division of the Earth) and he falls in love with them.  His father Yazdegerd I passes away and Bahram returns to Persia to claim his throne from pretenders.  After some episodes he is recognized as King and rescues the Persians from a famine.  Once the country is stable, the King searches for the seven princesses and wins them as his brides.  His architect is ordered to construct seven domes for each of his new brides.  The architect tells him that each of the seven climes is ruled by one of the seven planets (classical planetary system of Zoroastrian-Islamic world) and advises him to assure good fortune by adorning each dome with the color that is associated with each clime and planet.  Bahram is skeptical but follows the advice of the architect.  The princesses take up residence in the splendid pavilions.  On each visit, the king visits the princesses on successive days of the week; on Saturday the Indian princess, who is governed by Saturn and so on.  The princesses names are Furak (Nurak), the daughter of the Rajah of India, as beautiful as the moon; Yaghma Naz, the daughter of the Khaqan of the Turks; Naz Pari, the daughter of the king of Khwarazm; Nasrin Nush, the daughter of the king of the Slavs; Azarbin (Azareyon), the daughter of the king of Morocco; Humay, the daughter of the Roman Caesar; and Diroste (wholesome), a beautiful Iranian princess from the House of Kay Ka'us.  Each princess relates to the king a story matching the mood of her respective color.  These seven beautifully constructed, highly sensuous stories occupy about half of the whole poem.  While the king is busy with the seven brides, his evil minister seizes power in the realm.  Bahram Gur discovers that the affairs of Persia are in disarray, the treasury is empty and the neighboring rulers are posed to invade.  He clears his mind first by going hunting.  After returning from hunt, he sees a suspended dog from a tree.  The owner of the dog, who was shepherd, tells the story of how his faithful watchdog had betrayed his flock to a she-wolf in return for sexual favors.  He starts investigating the corrupt minister and from the multitude of complaints, he selects seven who tell him the injustice they have suffered.  The minister is subsequently put to death and Bahram Gur restores justice and orders the seven pleasure-domes to be converted to fire temples for the pleasure of God. Bahram then goes hunting for the last time but mysteriously disappears.  As a pun on words, while trying to hunt the wild ass (gūr) he instead finds his tomb (gūr).

Ritter, in his introduction to the critical edition describes it as: "the best and most beautiful epic in New Persian poetry and at the same time [. . .] one of the most important poetical creations of the whole of oriental Indo-European literature". The Haft Peykar is considered the poet's masterpiece. Overall, Nezami illustrates the harmony of the universe, the affinity of the sacred and the profane, and the concordance of ancient and Islamic Iran.

The story was translated to English in 1924 by Charles Edward Wilson.  A newer English rendering based on more complete manuscripts was accomplished by Julie Scott Meysami in 1995.

The following lines present an excerpt (Original Persian):

Other poetry
Only a small corpus of his Persian lyric poetry, mainly qaṣīdahs ("odes") and ghazals ("lyrics") have survived. Ten of his quatrains have also been recorded in the anthology Nozhat al-Majales (which was compiled around 1250) by Jamal Khalil Shirvani along with 23 other poets from Ganja. A famous ghazal of Nezami talks about altruism as the path for reaching the ultimate spiritual goal:

Legacy

Nizami, whose works are all written in Persian, has a very high reputation in Iran, Afghanistan and Tajikistan, where Persian is the official language. His poetry is especially well known in Iran, and is also very popular in Azerbaijan, where his birthplace and mausoleum are located. He is known in other countries, especially in India and Pakistan .

Persian culture
The influence of Neẓāmi's work on the subsequent development of Persian literature has been enormous and the Khamseh became a pattern that was emulated in later Persian poetry (and also in other Islamic literatures).  The legacy of Nezami is widely felt in the Islamic world and his poetry has influenced the development of Persian, Arabic, Turkish, Kurdish and Urdu poetry amongst many other languages.
In the history of Persian miniature painting, the stories in Nezami's poems alongside those of Ferdowsi's Shahnama have been the most frequently illustrated literary works. According to the Encyclopædia Britannica, Nezami is "admired in Persian-speaking lands for his originality and clarity of style, though his love of language for its own sake and of philosophical and scientific learning makes his work difficult for the average reader."  Nezami composed his verses in Persian language and Western encyclopedias such as Encyclopedia of Islam, Encyclopædia Iranica, Encyclopædia Britannica and orientalists of many countries consider Nezami as a significant Persian poet and hail him as the greatest exponent of romantic epic poetry in Persian literature.
Amongst the many notable poets who have taken the Five Treasures of Nezami as their model may be mentioned Amir Khusro, Jalal Farahani, Khwaju Kermani, Mohammad Katebi Tarr-Shirini, Abdul Rahman Jami, Hatefi Jami, Vahshi Bafqi, Maktabi Shirazi, Ali-Shir Nava'i, Abdul Qader-e Bedel Dehlavi, Fuzûlî, Hashemi Kermani, Fayzi, Jamali and Ahmad Khani.  Not only poets, but also historians such as Rawandi were influenced by Nezami's poetry and used his poems as a source for rendering history.  Besides these, scores of poets have started their composition with the first line of the Makhzan al-Asrar.
According to Rudolf Gelpke, "Many later poets have imitated Nizami's work, even if they could not equal and certainly not surpass it; Persians, Turks, Indians, to name only the most important ones. The Persian scholar Hekmat has listed not less than forty Persian and thirteen Turkish versions of Layli and Majnun."
According to Vahid Dastgerdi, "If one would search all existing libraries, one would probably find more than 1000 versions of Layla and Majnun."
Jami in his Nafahatol Ons remarks that: "Although most of Nezami's work on the surface appear to be romance, in reality they are a mask for the essential truths and for the explanation of divine knowledge."
Jami in his Baharestan mentions that "Nezami's excellence is more manifest than the sun and has no need of description.  Hashemi of Kerman remarks: The empire of poetry obtained its law and order from Nezami's beautiful verses and To present words before Nezami's silent speech is a waste of time."

Ganjavi poems in the Indian subcontinent 

Ganjavi's poems were very popular in the Indian subcontinent. Persian language and literature have had a great impact on the entire Indian subcontinent. Nizami Ganjavi has been imitated by many poets due to his unique style of speech and language of poetry. Poets who have imitated Ganjavi's woto include: Amir Khusro Delhi, Khwaju Kermani, Jami, Hatefi, Ghasemi, Vahshi Bafqi, 'Orfi Shirazi, Maktabi, Faizi, Ashraf Maraghi, Azar Bigdeli, Badriddin Hilali , Rumi Kermani, Maulana Navidi Shirazi and Salman Savaji.
Amir Khusro Dehlavi praises Ganjavi in his poems as a master of the art of praise.
Amir Khusro writes:
"The ruler of the kingdom of words, famed hero,
Scholar and poet, his goblet [glass] toasts.
In it – pure wine, it's drunkingly sweet,
Yet in goblet [glass] beside us – only muddy setting."
According to the book Persian Inscriptions on Indian Monuments in the Rashtrapati Bhavan in Ashoka Hall, the most important hall of the Indian Presidential Palace, Persian poems were written and decorated with paintings from Iran or Persia such as the Fateh Ali Shah, Shah Qajar and poems of Hafez, Khayyam and Nezami Ganjavi are painted on the ceiling and parts of the hall. A large oil painting illustration of Nezami Ganjavi and a large painting of a Persian lady on both sides of the Ashoka Hall of Rashtrapati Bhavan.
The Khamsa was a popular subject for lavish manuscripts with painted miniatures at the Persian and Mughal courts in later centuries. Examples include the Khamsa of Nizami (British Library, Or. 12208), created for the Mughal(Gurkanid) Emperor Akbar in the 1590s.

Soviet Union

In the early 1940s and to mark the 800th anniversary of Nizami Ganjavi, Azerbaijani composer Uzeyir Hajibeyov planned to write seven songs based on Nizami's poem about the Seven Beauties. However Hajibeyov wrote only two songs: Sensiz (Without You, 1941) and Sevgili Janan (Beloved, 1943). Another Azerbaijani composer Gara Garayev, composed Seven Beauties (ballet) in 1947–48 based on Nizami's eponymous poem that won an international acclaim. He also composed Leyli and Majnun (ballet) that premiered on 25 May 1969 at the Azerbaijan State Academic Opera and Ballet Theater in Baku and later was recorded as a film.  
A minor planet, called 3770 Nizami, was discovered by Soviet astronomer Lyudmila Chernykh in 1974 and named after him. Further, the Museum of Azerbaijan literature in Baku is named after Nizami.

Azerbaijan

Nezami was depicted on the obverse of the Azerbaijani 500 manat banknote of 1993–2006. In 2008, coinciding with the 800th anniversary of his death, the National Bank of Azerbaijan minted a 100 manat gold commemorative coin dedicated to his memory.
The Nizami Museum of Literature is located in Baku, Republic of Azerbaijan. One of the Baku Metro stations is also named after Nizami Ganjavi. There is Institute of Literature named after Nizami and Cinema named after Nizami in Baku. One of the districts of Baku is called Nizami raion. The life of Nizami Ganjavi is shown in the Azerbaijani movie "Nizami" (1982), in which the leading role, role of Nizami Ganjavi, was played by Muslim Magomayev. The Nizami Mausoleum, built in honor of Nizami, stands just outside the city of Ganja in Azerbaijan. It is a tall cylindrical building, surrounded by gardens. To one side, there is a metal statue commemorating Nizami's epic poems. The mausoleum was originally built in 1947 in place of an old collapsed mausoleum and rebuilt in its present form when the Azerbaijani Republic regained its independence after the fall of the Soviet Union in 1991.

Monuments to Nezami are found in many cities of Republic of Azerbaijan and Iran, as well as in Moscow, St. Petersburg and Udmurtiya (Russia), Kyiv (Ukraine), Beijing (China), Tashkent (Uzbekistan), Marneuli (Georgia), Chişinău (Moldova), Rome (Italy).

2021 was declared as "Year of Nizami Ganjavi" in the country.

Japanese translation 
"The Story of the Seven Queens (Haft Peykar)", translated into Japanese by Tsuneo Kuroyanagi, published by Heibonsha, July 1971. (Toyo Bunko 191)
"Khosrow and Shireen" , translated by Emiko Okada, published by Heibonsha, June 1977. (Toyo Bunko 310)
"Layla and Majunoon", translated by Emiko Okada, Heibonsha, February 1981. (Toyo Bunko 394)  ."

Western reception
German poet and writer Johann Wolfgang von Goethe wrote: "A gentle, highly gifted spirit, who, when Ferdowsi had completed the collected heroic traditions, chose for the material of his poems the sweetest encounters of the deepest love. Majnun and Layli, Khosrow and Shirin, lovers he presented; meant for one another by premonition, destiny, nature, habit, inclination, passion staunchly devoted to each other; but divided by mad ideas, stubbornness, chance, necessity, and force, then miraculously reunited, yet in the end again in one way or another torn apart and separated from each other."

With regards to the recitation of his poetry, Peter Chelkowski states: "The memorization and recitation of their literary heritage has alway beens vital to Iranians, whose attitude towards the power of the written and spoken word is reverential. Even today the national passion for poetry is constantly expressed over radio and television, in teahouses, in literary societies, in daily conversation, and in the Musha'areh, the poetry recitation contest. Nizami's work serves as a vehicle and a symbol of this tradition, for it unites universality with deep-rooted artistic endeavor, a sense of justice and passion for the arts and sciences with spirituallity and genuine piety. For richness and fineness of metaphor, accuracy, and profundity of psychological observation, and sheer virtuosity of storytelling, Nizami is unequalled".

Nezami's story of Layla and Majnun also provided the namesake for a hit single by Eric Clapton, also called "Layla". Recorded with the group Derek and the Dominos, the song was released on the 1970 album Layla and Other Assorted Love Songs. The album was influenced by Nezami and his poetry of unrequited love. The fifth song of the album, "I Am Yours", was based on a poem by Nezami, set to music by Clapton.

In 2004, there was a conference on Nezami organized at the University of Cambridge. The proceedings of this conference were published under the title Nizami: A Key to the Treasure of Hakim in 2011.

See also
Nizami Museum of Azerbaijani Literature

Ferdowsi
Khaqani
List of Persian poets and authors
Nozhat al-Majales
Persian literature
Asadi Tusi
Vis and Rāmin
Behrouz Servatian, noted Nizami researcher

Notes

References
Encyclopædia Iranica, "Khamsa", Domenico Parrello
E.G. Browne. Literary History of Persia. (Four volumes, 2,256 pages, and twenty-five years in the writing). 1998. 
Biography of Nizami Dr. Julie S. Meisami of Oxford University
Jan Rypka, History of Iranian Literature. Reidel Publishing Company. 1968 . 
Chopra, R M, Nizami Ganjavi (1141-1209): The Greatest Master of Persian Romantic Mesnavi, 2014, Sparrow Publication, Kolkata. 
Christine van Ruymbeke. Science and Poetry in Medieval Persia: The Botany of Nizami's Khamsa . University of Cambridge Press, 2008.
Christine van Ruymbeke. "From culinary recipe to pharmacological secret for a successful wedding night: the scientific background of two images related to fruit in the Xamse of Nezâmi Ganjavi", Festschrift in honour of Professor J.T.P. de Bruijn, Persica, Annual of the Dutch-Iranian Society, (Leiden), 2002, pp. 127–136
C. A. (Charles Ambrose) Storey and Franço de Blois (2004), "Persian Literature – A Biobibliographical Survey: Volume V Poetry of the Pre-Mongol Period.", RoutledgeCurzon; 2nd revised edition (June 21, 2004).  .
K. Talattof & J.W. Clinton, The Poetry of Nizami Ganjavi: Knowledge, Love, and Rhetoric. –  New York, 2001
 Talattof, Kamran, Nizami's Unlikely Heroines: A Study of the Characterizations of Women in Classical Persian Literature.
[ J. S. Meisami(Translator) Haft Paykar: A Medieval Persian Romance., New York: Oxford University Press, 1995]
[ Johan Christoph Burgel & Christine van Ruyuymbeke, "Nizami: A Key to the Treasure of the Hakim ", Amsterdam University Press, 2011]
[ Peter J. Chelkowski, "Mirror of the Invisible World", New York: Metropolitan Museum of Art, 1975]

External links

Persian Literature in Translation The Packard Humanities Institute
Persian Literature in Translation The Packard Humanities Institute: Lailî and Majnûn
Persian Literature in Translation The Packard Humanities Institute: Haft Paikar: Translated from the Persian, with a Commentary, by C. E. Wilson, B.A. (Lond.)
Persian Literature in Translation The Packard Humanities Institute: Eskandar-Nama (The Book of Alexander) translated by  Henry Wilberforce-Clarke

Nizami, Jamal al-Din Ilyas. A biography by Prof. Iraj Bashiri, University of Minnesota.
Nezami's works in original Persian at RiRa, the Persian Digital Library
Nezami's works in original Persian at Ganjoor Persian Library
The Legend of Leyli and Majnun
Bio: Nezami Ganjavi

 University of Arizona Resources on Nezami Ganjavi

Viewpoints on Nezami's background
 Academician IM Diakonov, personal impressions of the anniversary of Nezami
 Article arguing for an Iranian background of Nezami from an Iranian writer titled:  "Politicization of the Background of Nizami Ganjavi: Attempted de-Iranization of a historical Iranian Figure by the USSR" by Ali DoostzadehPDF version  Another site
 Siavash Lornejad, Ali Doostzadeh "On the Modern Politicization of the Persian Poet Nezami Ganjavi", Edited by Victoria Arakelova, YEREVAN SERIES FOR ORIENTAL STUDIES (Editor of the Series Garnik Asatrian), Caucasian Centre for Iranian Studies, Yerevan, 2012.

 
1140s births
1209 deaths
Writers from Ganja, Azerbaijan
Iranian people of Kurdish descent
Wisdom literature
12th-century Persian-language writers
13th-century Persian-language poets
Poets from the Seljuk Empire
12th-century Iranian people
13th-century Iranian people
Poets of the Shirvanshahs